Manning Lee Stokes (June 21, 1911 – January 5, 1976) was an American novelist who worked under a large number of pseudonyms.  He specialized in pulp fiction, especially in the genres of mystery, detective fiction, westerns, sleaze, spy fiction and science fiction. Stokes is also notable as one of the innovators of the graphic novel.

Early life 
On 21 June 1911, Stokes was born in St. Louis, Missouri. His father was William John Stokes and his mother was Bearnice Lee.

Personal 
In Sept 1957, Stokes's brother, Ben McCutchen Stokes, died in Indianapolis, Indiana.

Stokes married March Lurea Marlow on September 26, 1959, who was previously married to his brother, Ben McCutchen Stokes (April 15, 1919 – September 22, 1957). They had no children of their own but Marlow had two children with his brother, Bearnice Lee Stokes (born April 29, 1953) and Benita McCutchen Stokes (born Feb 04, 1956 ).

On January 5, 1976, Stokes died at his home in Peekskill, now a part of Cortlandt Manor, Westchester County, New York. He is buried in a National Cemetery located in Farmingdale, New York.

Career
Starting in 1945, Stokes published under his own name and at least 9 different pseudonyms.

Books by Manning Lee Stokes (Under his own name) 
The Wolf Howls “Murder” (Prize Mystery Novels #21, Phoenix Press, 1945)
Green for a Grave (Phoenix Press, 1946)
The Dying Room (Mercury Mystery #124, Phoenix Press, 1947)
The Case of the Winking Buddha (St. John Publications, 1950)
The Lady Lost Her Head (Phoenix Press, 1950)
The Crooked Circle (Graphic Mystery #40, 1951) (also released as “Too Many Murderers”, Graphic Mystery #98, 1955)
Murder Can't Wait (Graphic Mystery #117, 1955)
The Case of the Presidents' Heads (Arcadia House, 1956)
The Case of the Judas Spoon (Arcadia House, 1957)
Under Cover of Night (Dell Publishing Co. Inc., 1958)
Triangle of Sin (Beacon Publishing 1959)
The Grave's in the Meadow (Dell Publishing Co. Inc., 1961)
Grand Prix (Avon Paperback, 1967)
Winning (Signet Books, 1969)
The Evangelist (Pyramid Books, 1974)
Corporate Hooker, Inc (Pocket Books, 1975)
Un trou dans l'herbe (Serie Noire, 1967) - French.

Books by Nick Carter (pseudo-name of Stokes) - Nick Carter-Killmaster Series 
This is a series of spy adventures published from 1964 until 1990. For a complete list, see Nick Carter-Killmaster. The publisher name also evolved from Award Books to Ace Books and Jove Books.

No actual author is credited for the books, with the Nick Carter name being used as a house pseudonym. Volumes varied between first person and third person narrative. Authors known to have contributed entries in the series are Michael Avallone, Valerie Moolman, Manning Lee Stokes and Martin Cruz Smith.

Publisher: Award Books
Run, Spy, Run (1964), #1
The China Doll (1968), #2
The Eyes of the Tiger (1965), #9
Istanbul (1965), #10
Web of Spies (1966), #11
Spy Castle (Tandem, 1966), #12 
Dragon Flame (1966), #14
The Golden Serpent (1967), #20
Mission to Venice (1967), #21
Double Identity (1967), #22
The Devil's Cockpit (1967), #23
A Korean Tiger (1967), #26
Assignment: Israel (1967), #27
The Red Guard (1967), #28
The Filthy Five (1967), #29
Macao (1968), #31
Temple of Fear (1968), #35
The Red Rays (1969), #41
The Cobra Kill (1969), #47
The Black Death (1970), #56

Books by Paul Edwards (pseudo-name of Stokes) - John Eagle “Expeditor” Series
Publisher: Pyramid Books
Needles of Death (1973), #1
The Brain Scavengers (1973), #2
Valley of Vultures (1973), #5
The Green Goddess (1975), #12
Silverskull (1975), #14

Books by Jeffrey Lord (pseudo-name of Stokes)- Richard Blade Series 
Publisher: Pinnacle Books
The Bronze Axe (1973), #1
The Jade Warrior (1969), #2
Jewel of Tharn (1969), #3
Slave of Sarma (1970), #4
Liberator of Jedd (1971), #5
Monster of the Maze (1973), #6
Pearl of Patmos (1973), #7
Undying World (1973), #8

Note: Kensington Books imprint includes Pinnacle Books.

Books by Bernice Ludwell (pseudo-name of Stokes)
Published by Arcadia House
Love Without Armor (1955)
Haunted Spring (1956)
Moon of Hope (1956)
Cordelia (1958)

Books by March Marlowe (pseudo-name of Stokes)
Published by Arcadia House
FBI Girl (1959)

Books by Ken Stanton (pseudo-name of Stokes) - The Aquanauts Series 
Publisher: Manor Books, Inc 
Cold Blue Death (1970), #1
Ten Seconds To Zero (1970), #2
Seek, Strike And Destroy (1970), #3
Sargasso Secret (1971), #4
Stalkers Of The Sea (1972), #5
Whirlwind Beneath The Sea (1972), #6
Operation Deep Six (1972), #7
Operation Steelfish (1972), #8
Evil Cargo (1973), #9
Operation Sea Monster (1974), #10
Operation Mermaid (1974), #11

Books by Kermit Welles (pseudo-name of Stokes)
Sin Preferred (Cameo Books No. 307, Detective House, Inc., New York, 1951)
Gambler's Girl (Venus Books, 1951)
She Had What It Takes (Venus Books #128, Star Guidance Inc., New York, 1951)
Wild Sister (Venus Books, 1951)
Pleasure Bound (Cameo Books No. 310, Detective House, Inc., New York, 1952)
See No Evil (Original Novels Foundation, 1952)
Beloved Enemy (Star Books, Sydney, Australia, 1954)
Reckless (Carnival, 1954)
Shanty Boat Girl (Cameo Books No. 338, Detective House, Inc., New York, 1954) (Reprint of Sin Preferred)
Blood on Boot Hill (Arcadia, 1958)
Reformatory Women (Bedside Books, Inc., 1959)
Wild Wanton (Brandon Books, 1959)
Strange Love (English Romance Library, No. 80)
Les soeurs rivales (Ferenczi, 1956) - French.

Books by Kirk Westley (pseudo-name of Stokes)
The Innocent Wanton (Venus Books, 1952) (Reprint of Wild Sister)
Shanty Boat Girl (Cameo Books No. 361, Detective House, Inc., New York, 1954) (Reprint of Sin Preferred) (Berkley Books, 1959) 
Man-Chaser (Carnival Books, 1954) (Reprint of Pleasure Bound)
The Velvet Trap (McFadden-Bartell Corp., 1971)

Books by Ford Worth (pseudo-name of Stokes) 
Pilgrim's Pistols (Phoenix, 1946)
Rustler's Warning (Phoenix Press, 1951)

Books by Helen Sayle (pseudonym of Stokes) 
The blue smock (Arcadia, 1958)

Other information
Stokes has had several novels published under two separate titles and two different pseudonyms, e.g.
Pleasure Bound (Kermit Welles) = Man-Chaser (Kirk Westley)
Sin Preferred (Kermit Welles) = Shanty Boat Girl (Kirk Westley)
Wild Sister (Kermit Welles) = The Innocent Wanton (Kirk Westley)

Other sources claim that Stokes has also published under the pseudonym “Lee Manning” although this cannot be easily corroborated.
The pseudonym "March Marlowe" is similar to his wife's maiden name (March Marlow).
The lead character in “The Aquanauts” series is named William Martin.  Stokes used the same name for a different character in the Nick Carter novel Double Identity
In the Nick Carter novel Dragon Flame Stokes introduces the character “Bob Ludwell” making use of one of his own pseudonyms “B (Bernice) Ludwell”.
In the Nick Carter novels, Stokes first introduces and subsequently sustains the character of Della Stokes - the secretary of Carter's boss, David Hawk.
In the Nick Carter novel Macao, Stokes uses his own first name as Carter's cover name (Frank Manning).

References

External links
MANNING LEE STOKES

1911 births
1976 deaths
20th-century American novelists
American mystery writers
American male novelists
American male short story writers
20th-century American short story writers
20th-century American male writers